The Infallible Pistol was a .32 ACP calibre handgun manufactured by the Davis-Warner Arms Corp during the early 20th century.

When Warner Arms Co. could no longer get the Schwarzlose Model 1908 pistols from Germany, they had .32 pocket pistols made in the United States in three variations. the front sights and the grips that there was a conscious effort to imitate the outline of the Schwarzlose.

The guns were called the "Davis-Warner Infallible", and their trademark was "Blocks the Sear", a reference to the way the safety worked. Unlike the Schwarzlose M1908, the Davis-Warner guns are fairly conventional, striker fired, blowbacks, using a breechblock rather than a slide, though, since Browning had patented the idea of an auto pistol slide with an integral breechblock.

They had one serious drawback. at the back of the guns, it has a small lever, the other a push through pin. If the shooter disassembled the pistol and forgot the turn that lever the right way, or forgot to push the pin all the way in, the breechblock would be stopped only by a small projection and could come back in his face. The guns were not "infallible" and the company soon went out of business.

References
 Infallible 32ACP Pistol thread at TheFirearmsForum.com
 Davis Warner Arms Corp at Cheaper Than Dirt

Semi-automatic pistols of the United States
.32 ACP semi-automatic pistols